Maguikay may refer to any of the following places in the Philippines:

 Maguikay, a barangay in the city of Mandaue
 Maguikay, a barangay in the municipality of Aurora, Zamboanga del Sur